Pseudomonas denitrificans is a Gram-negative aerobic bacterium that performs denitrification. It was first isolated from garden soil in Vienna, Austria. It overproduces cobalamin (vitamin B12), which it uses for methionine synthesis and it has been used for manufacture of the vitamin. Scientists at Rhône-Poulenc Rorer took a genetically engineered strain of the bacteria, in which eight of the cob genes involved in the biosynthesis of the vitamin had been overexpressed, to establish the complete sequence of methylation and other steps in the cobalamin pathway.

Based on 16S rRNA analysis, P. denitrificans has been placed in the P. pertucinogena group.

References

External links
Type strain of Pseudomonas denitrificans at BacDive -  the Bacterial Diversity Metadatabase

Pseudomonadales
Bacteria described in 1961